"Drop the Boy" is a song by British boy band Bros. It was written by Nicky Graham and Tom Watkins, and released in March 1988 as the follow-up single to "When Will I Be Famous?". The single reached number-one in Ireland and number two in the UK, and was certified silver in the UK. Additionally, it peaked within the top 10 also in Australia, Denmark, New Zealand, Norway, Switzerland and West Germany.

Critical reception
Debbi Voller from Number One concluded in her review of the song, "It'll be a biggie, and deservedly so".

Track listings
 7-inch single
A. "Drop the Boy
B. "The Boy Is Dropped"

 12-inch single
A1. "Drop the Boy" (the Shep Pettibone mix)
B1. "Drop the Boy" (the Shep Pettibone dub mix)
B2. "The Boy Is Dropped"

 12-inch "Art Mix" single
A1. "Drop the Boy" (Art mix)
B1. "Drop the Boy" (the Shep Pettibone dub mix)
B2. "The Boy Is Dropped"

 CD single
 "Drop the Boy"
 "Drop the Boy" (the Shep Pettibone mix)
 "When Will I Be Famous?" (remix)
 "The Boy Is Dropped"

Charts

Weekly charts

Year-end charts

Certifications

References

Bros (British band) songs
1988 singles
1988 songs
CBS Records singles
Song recordings produced by Nicky Graham
Songs written by Nicky Graham
Songs written by Tom Watkins (music manager)